There are several rivers named São Miguel River in Brazil:

 São Miguel River (Alagoas)
 São Miguel River (Espírito Santo)
 São Miguel River (Minas Gerais)
 São Miguel River (Rondônia)

See also
 São Miguel (disambiguation)
 San Miguel River (disambiguation)